Shah Mar (also Romanized as Shāh Mār; also known as Shahyār) is a village in Dinavar Rural District, Dinavar District, Sahneh County, Kermanshah Province, Iran. At the 2006 census, its population was 186, in 50 families.

References 

Populated places in Sahneh County